Far from the Motherland is a 1960 Soviet spy film directed by Aleksei Shvachko and written by Yuri Dold-Mikhajlik, based on his novel And One Warrior in the Field ( (1957).

Plot
During the Second World War, a Soviet agent goes deep undercover in Nazi Germany to find the location of the secret underground plant that produces new weapons.

Release

Far from the Motherland was released in the Soviet Union on 9 May 1960 (Victory Day).

It was the highest-grossing film in the Soviet Union for 1960, with 42 million tickets sold.

References

External links

 (in Russian, no subtitles)

1960 drama films
Soviet historical drama films
Soviet spy films
Films directed by Aleksei Shvachko
Dovzhenko Film Studios films
World War II spy films
Eastern Front of World War II films